The Saturn Award for Best Animated Film (formerly Saturn Award for Best Animation) is one of the annual awards given by the American professionnel organization, the Academy of Science Fiction, Fantasy & Horror Films. The Saturn Awards, which are the oldest film-specialized awards to reward science fiction, fantasy, and horror achievements (the Hugo Award for Best Dramatic Presentation, awarded by the World Science Fiction Society who reward science fiction and fantasy in various media, is the oldest award for science fiction and fantasy films), included the Best Animated Film category for the first time only in 1978, was revived in 1982, and still currently reactivated since 2002.

It is one of the oldest awards to reward animated films. This award has been achieved sixteen times, including ten times to Pixar films.

Winners and nominees

Early years

2000s

2010s

2020s

References

External links
 The Official Saturn Awards Site
Saturn Awards on IMDb

Animated Film
Awards for best animated feature film
Awards established in 1978